Carolin Tamara Hingst (born 18 September 1980 in Donauwörth) is a German pole vaulter.

She finished 10th at the 2001 World Championships in Edmonton, fourth at the 2005 European Indoor Athletics Championships in Madrid and 10th at the 2005 World Championships in Helsinki.

Her personal best is 4.72 metres, achieved in July 2010 in Biberach an der Riß. This ranks her fourth among German pole vaulters.

Competition record

See also
 Germany all-time top lists - Pole vault

References

External links 

 Official website 
 
 DLV profile 

1980 births
Living people
People from Donauwörth
Sportspeople from Swabia (Bavaria)
German female pole vaulters
Johannes Gutenberg University Mainz alumni
German national athletics champions
Athletes (track and field) at the 2004 Summer Olympics
Athletes (track and field) at the 2008 Summer Olympics
Olympic athletes of Germany